Cho I-hsuan (born 21 February 2000) is a Taiwanese professional tennis player.

She has won four doubles titles on the ITF circuit. On 27 July 2015, she reached her best singles ranking of world No. 945. On 8 October 2018, she peaked at No. 505 in the doubles rankings.

Cho made her WTA Tour main-draw debut at the 2016 Taiwan Open where she received a wildcard for the doubles draw, partnering Shih Hsin-yuan.

ITF Circuit finals

Doubles: 13 (9 titles, 4 runners-up)

Notes

References

External links
 
 

2000 births
Living people
Taiwanese female tennis players
Sportspeople from Keelung
21st-century Taiwanese women